Marcia Griffiths & Friends is a studio album by a Jamaican reggae female singer, Marcia Griffiths, released on October 30, 2012, under VP Records. No other female vocalist has charted hits in as wide a range of styles in the genre, and the album was released as a tribute to Griffiths. Penthouse productions presents the album as a two CD collection with 38 duets recorded in collaboration with the label.

Track listing

Disc 1

Disc 2

References

2012 albums
Marcia Griffiths albums